The 1896 United States presidential election in Kansas took place on November 3, 1896. All contemporary 45 states were part of the 1896 United States presidential election. Kansas voters chose ten electors to the Electoral College, which selected the president and vice president.

Kansas was won by the Democratic nominees, former U.S. Representative William Jennings Bryan of Nebraska and his running mate Arthur Sewall of Maine.

With his win in the state, Bryan became the first Democratic presidential candidate to win the state of Kansas. Bryan would later lose Kansas to Republican William McKinley four years later during their rematch and would later lose the state again to William Howard Taft in 1908. This is also the only election since Kansas statehood in which the Republican candidate won the presidency without Kansas. This was the last election until 2020 in a Democrat carried Johnson County with a majority.

This was the first of six elections in which the Democratic nominee carried Kansas, traditionally a Republican bastion like the other Plains states. The others were 1912, 1916, 1932, 1936, and 1964.

Results

Results by county

See also
 United States presidential elections in Kansas

Notes

References

Kansas
1896
1896 Kansas elections